Hmeinsein is a village in Ye Township in the Mon State of south-east Burma. It is located north-west of Ye city.

Nearby towns and villages include Awainggale (2.2 nm), Zuntalin (1.0 nm), Taungbon (3.1 nm).
Sakale (2.8 nm) and Sonmatha (1.4 nm).

External links
Satellite map at Maplandia.com

Populated places in Mon State